The pygmy nuthatch (Sitta pygmaea) is a tiny songbird, about  long and about 10 grams in weight.

Description 
Measurements:

 Length: 
 Weight: 
 Wingspan: 

It ranges from southern British Columbia south through various discontinuous parts of the western U.S. (northwest U.S., Sierra Nevada range, southern Rockies, etc.), to central Mexico. It is usually found in pines (especially ponderosa pines), Douglas-firs, and other conifers. Pygmy nuthatches clamber acrobatically in the foliage of these trees, feeding on insects and seeds; less often they creep along limbs or the trunk like bigger nuthatches.

Pygmy nuthatches nest in cavities in dead stubs of conifers, lining the bottom of the cavity with pine-cone scales, plant down, and other soft plant and animal materials. They may fill cracks or crevices around the entrance with fur; the function of this behavior is unknown. The female lays 4–9 eggs, which are white with fine reddish-brown spotting. She does most of the incubation, which lasts about 16 days. The young leave the nest about 22 days after hatching.

This species is highly gregarious. A nesting pair may have other birds as helpers. Outside the breeding season, this bird wanders in noisy flocks. It also roosts communally; over 100 birds have been seen huddled in a single tree cavity.

All plumages are similar, with a warm gray cap, blue-gray upper-parts, and whitish underparts. The only feature not seen in the photograph is a whitish spot on the nape, particularly in worn plumage (summer). Vocalizations are highly varied chirps, peeps, and chattering.

This species is very similar to the brown-headed nuthatch of the southeastern U.S.  Their ranges have no overlap.

The pygmy nuthatch features prominently in the climax of the 2000 film Charlie's Angels, in which Cameron Diaz's character, Natalie, discovers the location of the villains' fortress by identifying the call of the pygmy nuthatch, which she says only live in Carmel, California—though the bird shown is not a pygmy nuthatch, which in any case is found in a much wider range. (The Hollywood impostor is a Venezuelan troupial, Icterus icterus.)

References

External links

Pygmy Nuthatch - Sitta pygmaea - USGS Patuxent Bird Identification InfoCenter
Pygmy Nuthatch Species Account - Cornell Lab of Ornithology
Photographs of Pygmy Nuthatches nesting in a box
Pygmy Nuthatch videos on the Internet Bird Collection
Article & RangeMaps InfoNatura, NatureServe
Pygmy Nuthatch photo gallery VIREO

Nuthatches
Birds of North America
Birds of the Rio Grande valleys
Birds of the United States
Native birds of the Western United States
Birds of the Sierra Nevada (United States)
Birds of Mexico
Birds described in 1839
Birds of the Sierra Madre Occidental